A Screw is the third EP by the New York City experimental rock group Swans. The EP's three songs were later appended as bonus tracks to the CD release of Holy Money.

Background and composition

The EP's title track sees the band diving their farthest into the realm of industrial dance music, complete with dubby, distorted vocals and complex programmed rhythms, a distinct contrast to the naturalistic album version. The piano-driven ode to obsessive love, "Blackmail", was Jarboe's first Swans track as lead vocalist. A reworked version of "Blackmail" appears on the 1987 album Children of God.

Regarding his contribution to the EP's title track, drummer Ted Parsons said:

Track listing

Notes
 Track 1 and 3 were mislabeled on most original releases. Later issues like the "Greed/Holy Money" compilation corrected this.

Personnel
 Michael Gira – vocals, samples, sounds, piano, bass
 Norman Westberg – guitar
 Harry Crosby – bass
 Algis Kizys – bass 
 Jarboe – vocals, backing vocals, mirage
 Ronaldo Gonzalez – drums
 Ted Parsons – drums
 Ivan Nahem – drums
 Greg Grinnell – trumpet
 Keene Carse – trombone

Charts

References

External links
 Swans official website – A Screw

1986 EPs
Swans (band) EPs
Albums produced by Michael Gira